Helopicus is a genus of springflies in the family Perlodidae. There are at least four described species in Helopicus.

Species
These four species belong to the genus Helopicus:
 Helopicus bogaloosa Stark & Ray, 1983
 Helopicus infuscatus (Newman, 1838)
 Helopicus nalatus (Frison, 1942)
 Helopicus subvarians (Banks, 1920) (vernal springfly)

References

Further reading

External links

 

Perlodidae
Articles created by Qbugbot